Joseph Myron Segel (January 9, 1931 – December 21, 2019) was an American entrepreneur. He was the founder of over 20 American companies, most notably QVC, an American television network, and the Franklin Mint, a producer of mail-order collectibles. Segel was named to the Direct Marketing Association's Hall of Fame in 1993. He was honored with a Lifetime Achievement Award from the Electronic Retailing Association and an honorary doctorate from Drexel University.

He was awarded the Philip H. Ward, Jr. Medal from The Franklin Institute in 1977.  In 2005, the Harvard Business School published their selection of The Greatest Business Leaders of the Twentieth Century.  Then, in 2007, the Wharton School of the University of Pennsylvania published their selection of The Most Influential Wharton Alumni and Faculty in the Wharton School's 125-year history. Segel was one of only 10 people who was on both of these lists.

Early life 
Born to a Jewish family, Segel, at the age of 13, started a successful printing business.  At 16, he entered the Wharton School of the University of Pennsylvania in Philadelphia. In 1951 he received a Bachelor of Science degree in Economics. As a graduate student, he taught introductory marketing classes while running the "Advertising Specialty Institute", his first significant business. A first in the industry, it published a centralized directory of promotional materials and their suppliers, the Advertising Specialty Register.

In 1964, Segel took note of two concurrent events – the passing of General Douglas MacArthur and people lining up at banks to buy up the last U.S. silver dollars. In response, he founded the National Commemorative Society, which introduced a monthly series of limited edition, sterling silver commemorative coin-like medals honoring events and heroes in American history, starting with a medal commemorating General Douglas MacArthur. Later that year, dissatisfied with the quality of the coin-medals produced by a subcontractor, he recruited Gilroy Roberts, then Chief Engraver of the U.S. Mint, to join him in starting the General Numismatics Corporation. GNC became the Franklin Mint in 1965, shortly after going public. The Franklin Mint quickly expanded to produce not only coin-like medals and casino tokens, but other collectibles, including car models, luxury board-game editions, and porcelain dolls.

Segel retired as chairman of Franklin Mint Corporation in 1973.

National Software Testing Laboratories
Segel founded the National Software Testing Laboratories aka NSTL in 1983. The company published several monthly newsletters including "Software Digest". The publications were often subscribed by IT departments of major corporations, as a basis to evaluate and consider products for their company. PC Hardware and software publishers often contracted the company to perform compatibility and performance tests. NSTL passed through a series of owners, including publisher McGraw-Hill, before being acquired by Intertek in 2007.

Public service
In 1971, Segel was elected chairman of the Board of Governors of the United Nations Association of the USA. Two years later, President Gerald Ford appointed him as a member of the U.S. Delegation to that year's United Nations General Assembly, where he served under Henry Kissinger. He also organized a national campaign of the Advertising Council to improve public understanding of the United Nations, chaired a national conference on the United Nations for the American Society of Newspapers Editors and testified in support of the United Nations before the U.S. Senate Foreign Relations Committee. In 1986 he wrote an article in The New York Times in defense of Secretary-General Kurt Waldheim's recently discovered service as a Wehrmacht intelligence officer during WWII.

QVC 
In 1986, Segel decided to start QVC ("Quality Value Convenience") after watching a videotape of the Home Shopping Network. Immediately, he identified many potential improvements, from the items offered for sale to their presentation. To lend credibility to the new company, QVC made a two-year deal to sell Sears products. He raised over $20 million in capital, including support from Ralph Roberts, the founder and chairperson of Comcast. Roberts was able to arrange deals in which cable companies received investment stakes in QVC in exchange for carrying the channel. Fifty-eight cable systems in twenty states signed on for the 7:30pm to 12:00 midnight broadcast, giving it an audience of 7.6 million TV homes for its November 24 launch. Publicly offered at $10 on September 5, 1986, QVC stock closed its first trading day at $20 per share, even though its first broadcast was months away.

Segel demanded that the presenters sell by informing, not pressuring the viewers about the product.  This meant that presenters would have to study each product, explain the many benefits of the product, and know the product's sales history in order to make the sell more informative and entertaining. He forbid the hard sell and, unlike the Home Shopping Network, established that customers could purchase at any time, with no last minute price cuts, and no high pressure tactics. From 1986 to 1989 the Plymouth-based Cable Value Network was the dominant player in the industry with HSN second and QVC a distant third.  Through the backing of cable operators, QVC launched a hostile takeover of CVN and wound up buying it out, only to take CVN off the air and replace it with QVC programming.  QVC emerged as HSN's only serious competitor, out of hundreds of copycats, even though it was on the verge of collapse in the early 1990s until Barry Diller came on board.  Today QVC employs a total of over 10,000 people, and did around $8.6 billion in business in fiscal year 2013, making it the second highest-grossing American television network, surpassed in revenue only by CBS.

Joseph Segel retired from QVC in 1993 upon Diller's hire, but remained involved in the network until 2013 in an advisory role.

Death
Segel died on December 21, 2019 at the age of 88 in Gladwyne, Pennsylvania from congestive heart failure.

Businesses started
 1947 - Eastern Advertising Co., Inc. -- advertising specialties.
 1949 - Desk-Sign Manufacturing Co., Inc. -- personalized desk signs.
 1950 - Magicard Co., Inc. -- promotional mailing pieces.
 1950 - Advertising Specialty Institute—promotional products trade information center.
 1953 - Colorcrafters, Inc. -- pioneer in full-color printing.
 1954 - Selective Gift Institute, Inc. -- business gift selection service.
 1960 - National Business Services, Inc. -- consolidation of last 3 businesses.
 1961 - Gem Publishing Co., Inc. – books featuring humorous sayings.
 1962 - Jordan-Edwards Co., Inc. -- pocket appointment and record books.
 1964 - National Commemorative Society, Inc. -- producer of commemorative medals.
 1964 - The Franklin Mint (initially called General Numismatics Corporation).
 1965 - Britannia Commemorative Society, Inc. -- producer of commemorative medals.
 1970 - Le Mirador, S.A. -- Swiss resort hotel, spa and conference center.
 1975 - Presidential Airways, Inc. -- private jet and helicopter charter service.
 1977 - RateSearch Corporation—computerized air freight rate analysis service.
 1981 - PermaColor Corporation—systems to preserve color photos.
 1983 - Software Digest, Inc. -- PC software rating reports.
 1983 - National Software Testing Laboratories, Inc. -- PC software testing.
 1986 - QVC Network, Inc. – televised home shopping.
 1997 - International Skincare Research, Inc. – Le Mirador skincare products for QVC.
 1997 - SmokeStoppers, Inc. – smoking cessation programs
 2008 - GoBYO.com - online restaurant database focusing on BYOB-friendly restaurants.

References

External links 
Budd Margolis, Home Shopping History: HSN & QVC
Joseph M. Segel  (an autobiography)

1931 births
2019 deaths
American computer businesspeople
American mass media owners
American retail chief executives
American technology chief executives
20th-century American Jews
American technology company founders
American television company founders
Businesspeople from Philadelphia
QVC people
Wharton School of the University of Pennsylvania alumni
20th-century American businesspeople
21st-century American Jews